Alexander Macdonell of Collachie (1762 – March 18, 1842) was a soldier and political figure in Upper Canada.

He was born in Scotland in 1762 and arrived in the Mohawk Valley of New York with other members of his family, including his brother, Angus Macdonell of Collachie. He served with the Royal Highland Emigrant Regiment during the American Revolution. In 1781, he came to Canada and joined Butler's Rangers until the regiment was disbanded in 1784.

Macdonell moved to York (Toronto), where he served as a Sheriff for the Home District from 1792 to 1805. He was elected to the 3rd Parliament of Upper Canada representing Glengarry & Prescott, serving until 1816. He was speaker of the House from 1804 to 1808.

At the start of the War of 1812, he became a colonel in the militia. In 1813, he was taken prison at Niagara by the Americans. In 1815, on his release, he was made superintendent of the Settling Department.

From 1831 to 1834 he was Chairman of the Home District Council and the last to serve the post before Toronto City Council was formed in 1834. In addition he was the Sheriff for the Home District.

Death
He died at Toronto on 18 March 1842.

External links
 
 Glengarry's Representatives in the Legislative Assembly of Upper Canada, University of Manitoba archives
 Dictionary of Canadian Biography

1762 births
1842 deaths
Immigrants to the Province of Quebec (1763–1791)
Members of the Legislative Assembly of Upper Canada
People from Highland (council area)
People from the United Counties of Stormont, Dundas and Glengarry
Politicians from Toronto
Scottish emigrants to pre-Confederation Ontario
Speakers of the Legislative Assembly of Upper Canada